Speleology is the scientific study of caves and other karst features, as well as their make-up, structure, physical properties, history, life forms, and the processes by which they form (speleogenesis) and change over time (speleomorphology). The term speleology is also sometimes applied to the recreational activity of exploring caves, but this is more properly known as caving, potholing (British English), or spelunking. Speleology and caving are often connected, as the physical skills required for in situ study are the same.

Speleology is a cross-disciplinary field that combines the knowledge of chemistry, biology, geology, physics, meteorology, and cartography to develop portraits of caves as complex, evolving systems.

History 
Before modern speleology developed, John Beaumont wrote detailed descriptions of some Mendip caves in the 1680s. The term speleology was coined by Émile Rivière in 1890.

Prior to the mid-nineteenth century the scientific value of caves was considered only in its contribution to other branches of science, and cave studies were considered part of the larger disciplines of geography, geology or archaeology. Very little cave-specific study was undertaken prior to the work of Édouard-Alfred Martel (1859–1938), the 'father of modern speleology', who through his extensive and well-publicised cave explorations introduced in France the concept of speleology as a distinct area of study. In 1895 Martel founded the Société de Spéléologie, the first organization devoted to cave science in the world. Other early speleologists include Herbert E. Balch.

An international speleological congress was proposed at a meeting in Valence-sur-Rhone, France in 1949 and first held in 1953 in Paris. The International Union of Speleology (UIS) was founded in 1965.

The growth of speleology is directly linked with that of the sport of caving, both because of the stimulation of public interest and awareness, and the fact that most speleological field-work has been conducted by sport cavers.

Cave geology, hydrogeology and biology 
Karst is a landscape that has limestone underneath which has been eroded. Caves are formed, the majority of the time, through chemical corrosion via a process of dissolution. Corrosion has several ways of doing this, it can be on carbonate rocks through chemical reactions, in gypsum and rock salt it can happen physically, and in silicate rocks and warm climate the decomposition of the materials can happen as well.

Geochemistry

Speleothems 

A speleothem is a geological formation by mineral deposits that accumulate over time in natural caves. Speleothems most commonly form in calcareous caves due to carbonate dissolution reactions. They can take a variety of forms, depending on their depositional history and environment. Their chemical composition, gradual growth, and preservation in caves make them useful paleoclimatic proxies.

Cave cartography 

The creation of an accurate, detailed map is one of the most common technical activities undertaken within a cave. Cave maps, called surveys, can be used to compare caves to each other by length, depth and volume, may reveal clues on speleogenesis, provide a spatial reference for further scientific study, and assist visitors with route-finding.

Cave biology 

Caves provide a home for many unique biota. Cave ecologies are very diverse, and not sharply distinct from surface habitats. Generally however, the deeper the cave becomes, the more rarefied the ecology.

Cave environments fall into three general categories:
 Endogean
the parts of caves that are in communication with surface soils through cracks and rock seams, groundwater seepage, and root protrusion.
 Parahypogean
the threshold regions near cave mouths that extend to the last penetration of sunlight.
 Hypogean
or "true" cave environments. These can be in regular contact with the surface via wind and underground rivers, or the migration of animals, or can be almost entirely isolated. Deep hypogean environments can host autonomous ecologies whose primary source of energy is not sunlight, but chemical energy liberated from limestone and other minerals by chemoautotrophic bacteria.

Cave organisms fall into three basic classes:

There are also so-called accidental trogloxenes which are surface organisms that enter caves for no survival reason. Some may even be troglophobes (“cave haters”), which cannot survive in caves for any extended period. Examples include deer which fell through a sinkhole, frogs swept into a cave by a flash flood, etc.

The two factors that limit cave ecologies are generally energy and nutrients. To some degree moisture is always available in actively forming Karst caves. Cut off from the sunlight and steady deposition of plant detritus, caves are poor habitats in comparison with wet areas on the surface. The majority of energy in cave environments comes from the surplus of the ecosystems outside. One major source of energy and nutrients in caves is dung from trogloxenes, the majority of which is deposited by bats. Other sources are mentioned above.

Cave ecosystems are very fragile. Because of their rarity and position in the ecosystem they are threatened by a large number of human activities. Dam construction, limestone quarrying, water pollution and logging are just some of the disasters that can devastate or destroy underground biological communities.

Other areas of cave science 
Speleologists also work with archaeologists in studying underground ruins, tunnels, sewers and aqueducts, such as the various inlets and outlets of the Cloaca Maxima in Rome.

See also

References

External links 
Different Types of Erosion  
National Speleological Society
 The Virtual Cave, an online guide to speleothems
 Biospeleology; The Biology of Caves, Karst, and Groundwater, by Texas Natural Science Center, the University of Texas at Austin and the Missouri Department of Conservation
 Speleogenesis Network, a communication platform for physical speleology and karst science research
 National Cave Research and Protection Organization, India
 cave-biology.org Cave biology, biospeleology in India
 Cave Biota; an evolving "webumentary", sponsored by Hoosier National Forest and Indiana Karst Conservancy
 IJS – Home Page (International Journal of Speleology) (in English, Italian, French, German, and Spanish)
 Caving News, Daily news and articles on caves, caving, speleology, karst and other information for cavers.

 
Earth sciences